John Cust (10 December 1874 – 1954) was a Scottish footballer who played in the Football League for Bury.

References

1874 births
1954 deaths
Scottish footballers
English Football League players
Association football forwards
Vale of Leven F.C. players
Bury F.C. players
Renton F.C. players